Signaling threshold-regulating transmembrane adapter 1 is a protein that in humans is encoded by the SIT1 gene.

References

Further reading